Inquiry: An Interdisciplinary Journal of Philosophy is a bimonthly peer-reviewed academic journal of philosophy published by Routledge. It was established in 1958 by Ingemund Gullvåg and Jacob Meløe in the spirit of Arne Naess and the so-called Oslo school in Norwegian philosophy and covers all areas of philosophy. It was originally published by Universitetsforlaget.

Abstracting and indexing 
Inquiry is abstracted and indexed in Arts and Humanities Citation Index, Current Contents/Arts & Humanities, Humanities Index, International Bibliography of the Social Sciences, Philosopher's Index, Social Sciences Citation Index, and Sociological Abstracts. According to the Journal Citation Reports, the journal has a 2015 impact factor of 1.079, ranking it 23rd out of 51 journals in the category "Ethics".

See also 
 List of ethics journals
 List of philosophy journals

References

External links 
 

Philosophy journals
English-language journals
Taylor & Francis academic journals
Bimonthly journals
Publications established in 1958
Arne Næss